Amanda Lathlin (born July 17, 1976) is a Canadian politician, who was elected to the Legislative Assembly of Manitoba in a by-election on April 22, 2015. She represents the constituency of The Pas-Kameesak as a member of the New Democratic Party of Manitoba.

She is the daughter of Oscar Lathlin, who represented The Pas in the provincial legislature from 1990 to 2008, and is the first First Nations woman ever elected to the provincial legislature.  In the 2019 election, after The Pas riding was redistributed, she won the newly-created riding of The Pas-Kameesak.

Prior to her election to the legislature, Lathlin worked for the University College of the North and served as a band councillor for the Opaskwayak Cree Nation.

Electoral record

References

Cree people
First Nations women in politics
New Democratic Party of Manitoba MLAs
People from The Pas
Women MLAs in Manitoba
Living people
21st-century Canadian politicians
21st-century Canadian women politicians
First Nations politicians
1976 births
Canadian indigenous women academics